Palamdorjiin Bayar (born 25 May 1941) is a Mongolian boxer. He competed in the men's featherweight event at the 1972 Summer Olympics.

References

1941 births
Living people
Mongolian male boxers
Olympic boxers of Mongolia
Boxers at the 1972 Summer Olympics
Place of birth missing (living people)
Featherweight boxers
20th-century Mongolian people